Vibe Australia is an Aboriginal media, communications and events management agency founded by Gavin Jones in 1993. Located in Darlinghurst, Sydney, New South Wales, they work with Aboriginal and Torres Strait Islander people throughout Australia.

History
Vibe Australia was founded in 1993 by Gavin Jones at the Boomalli Aboriginal Artists Cooperative.

In June 2014, Vibe Australia funding was cut under coalition budget measures designed to reallocate funding to Indigenous education programs including Deadly Awards funding phased back to $1 million and no funding provided for future years. On 12 July 2014, Gavin Jones died at age 47.

On 14 July 2014, Vibe Australia announced that all Vibe projects including the Deadly Awards concluded on 30 June 2014.

Productions

Deadly Sounds
A weekly radio program syndicated to over 250 Aboriginal community stations.

Deadly Vibe
A national magazine focusing on health, sport, music and lifestyle.

In Vibe
A magazine for Indigenous people in secure rehabilitation care and at risk. Hosted by Indigenous broadcaster, artistic director and author, Rhoda Roberts.

Move it Mob Style
A children's television show focusing on health, dance and lifestyle. Broadcast by NITV.

The show was filmed in Brisbane with hosts Naomi Wenitong and Shannon Williams.

With the studios in Brisbane getting ready to shut down, Series 4 is now filmed in Sydney with new hosts Ghenoa Gela and Wakara Gondarra replacing Naomi Wenitong and Shannon Williams. With the move from Brisbane also comes a move from Post Op as the broadcast provider. Series 4 premiered in March 2014.

The Deadlys

Since 1995, the National Aboriginal and Torres Strait Islander Music, Sport, Entertainment and Community awards, known as the Deadly Awards or simply "The Deadlys", have been held at the Sydney Opera House and broadcast by SBS.

The Vibe 3on3
A national music and sporting event to promote health, well-being, identity and sportsmanship. Hosted by former Harlem Globetrotter 'Smiling' Dwayne Cross and former Sydney Kings coach Claude 'Starsky' Williams.

References

External links
Home page

Indigenous Australian musical groups
Indigenous Australian musicians
Indigenous Australian mass media
Organisations serving Indigenous Australians
1993 establishments in Australia
2014 disestablishments in Australia